Coronado is a 2003 German-American adventure film directed by Claudio Fäh in his directorial debut. It stars Kristin Dattilo, Clayton Rohner, Michael Lowry and John Rhys-Davies.

Plot
Leaving Beverly Hills, Claire Winslow goes to Switzerland to deliver some forgotten papers to her business man fiancé (planning to surprise him). Once there, she is told he has gone to politically unstable El Coronado in Central America. She goes to El Coronado and discovers he may have been abducted by rebels. To find him, she gets involved with persons supplying arms to the rebels and heads into the jungle.

Cast
 Kristin Dattilo as Claire Winslow
 Clayton Rohner as Arnet McClure
 Michael Lowry as Will Gallagher
 John Rhys-Davies as President Hugo Luis Ramos

Release
Coronado premiered on August 16, 2003 at the Hamburg Fantasy Filmfest. It was released on DVD on December 28, 2004.

External links
 
 

2003 films
2000s adventure films
Films directed by Claudio Fäh
Films set in South America
Films about Latin American military dictatorships
2003 directorial debut films
2000s English-language films